Jerome Foster, better known as Knobody, is an American music producer and A&R.  Knobody has produced records across different genres including soul, R&B, hip hop and rock for several multi-platinum artists including Jay-Z, Ne-Yo, Akon, The Game, Big Pun, Mýa and R.E.M.  Knobody worked as an A&R at SRC Records/Universal. Due to the enormous success Akon experienced following the release of his debut album, Knobody was recognized as a World Top 10 A&R. He is not to be confused with Bay Area rapper/producer and Hieroglyphics crew affiliate who also goes by the name Knobody.

Acclaim
Recognized for his hand in launching the careers of world-renowned artists, Knobody has influenced the success of Jay-Z, Akon Big Pun. Knobody's contributions to these artists' careers has had an enormous impact on the world of hip hop and R&B.

Jay-Z
Knobody produced the classic single "Can't Knock the Hustle" for Jay-Z, the first track on the artist's debut album Reasonable Doubt.  "Can't Knock the Hustle" was Jay-Z's first chart single, bringing the rapper into the limelight and jump starting a career that has resulted in millions of album sales worldwide.  Since 1996, Jay-Z has released hundreds of records,  yet "Can't Knock the Hustle" - praised by many as a "classic" - lives on to be recognized as one of the greatest songs he has ever recorded.  As Steve Juon of RapReviews.com describes, "Knobody put together an incredibly smooth opening track for Jay that became the mantra of his career."

Big Pun
Knobody produced "Still Not a Player", the lead single from Big Pun's first album, Capital Punishment, which debuted at #5 on the Billboard 200 charts and became the first album by a solo Latino rap artist to reach the platinum sales mark.  "Still Not a Player" is credited with taking Big Pun from underground obscurity into super-stardom.  MTV's Andrea Duncan writes, "Big Pun made his name in the hip-hop underground, and then, in 1998, rode the made-for-radio vibe of ‘Still Not a Player’ to the top of the R&B chart and full-blown rap stardom."  As stated in All Music Guide to Hip Hop by Valdimir Bogdanov, "Big Pun's solo debut, 'Capital Punishment', was released in 1998 and debuted in the Top Five thanks to ‘Still Not a Player,’ a club-ready remix of ‘I'm Not a Player’ that proved massively popular." Riding the wave of success created by "Still Not a Player", Big Pun's debut album "Capital Punishment" was nominated for Rap Album of the Year at the 1999 GRAMMY Awards.  In the May/June 2006 issue of Scratch Magazine,  "Still Not a Player" was named one of hip hop's 25 greatest remixes of all time.

Akon
During his time as an A&R at SRC Records/Universal, Knobody was responsible for breaking Akon as an artist and developing his first album, Trouble.  Knobody produced Akon's radio hit, "Locked Up" (Remix) featuring Styles P, a contribution that proved to have an enormous impact on the success of the album and the artist.   Johnny Loftus of All Music Guide proclaims, "The success of the song ‘Locked Up’ raised Akon's profile..."  Trouble was certified platinum by the RIAA on April 27, 2005, as Akon became a bona fide R&B star. Due to the enormous success Akon experienced following the release of his debut album, Knobody was recognized as a World Top 10 A&R in 2005.

Production credits

Singles
1993: "So Whatcha Want?" (MF Grimm)
1995: "Funky Piano" (E. Bros)   New Jersey Drive Soundtrack
1996: "Can't Knock the Hustle" (Jay-Z f/Mary J. Blige)
1997: "How You Want It" (Jungle Brothers f/De La Soul & Q-Tip)
1998: "Still Not a Player" (Big Pun f/Joe)
1998: "Movin' Out" (Mýa f/ Raekwon & Noreaga)
2002: "I've Been High" (R.E.M.)
2004: "Locked Up (Remix)" (Akon f/Styles P)
2004: "Coo Coo Chee" (Ric-A-Che)
2006: "Feels So Good" (Remy Ma f/Ne-Yo)
2006: "Wanna Be" (The Fugees)
2008: "Game's Pain" (The Game f/Keyshia Cole)

Songs

Awards
Hit Quarters named Knobody a "World Top 10 A&R" in 2005 as a result of his involvement in Akon's career-launching album Trouble.  In 2008, Knobody was awarded a GRAMMY for "Leaving Tonight", his contribution to Ne-Yo's Because of You album, which won the 2007 GRAMMY Award for Best Contemporary R&B Album.

References

External links
Interview, HitQuarters Sep 2005

African-American record producers
Hip hop record producers
American hip hop record producers
Living people
Businesspeople from New York City
Year of birth missing (living people)
Record producers from New York (state)
21st-century African-American people